The 55th Guldbagge Awards ceremony, presented by the Swedish Film Institute, honoring the best Swedish films of 2019 and took place on 20 January 2020 at Cirkus in Stockholm. The ceremony was televised by SVT and comedian Emma Molin hosted the ceremony for the second year in a row. The nominees were announced on 8 January 2020.

Winners and nominees 
The nominees for the 55th Guldbagge Awards were announced on 8 January 2020 in Stockholm, by the Swedish Film Institute.

Awards 

Winners are listed first and highlighted in boldface.

Films with multiple nominations and awards

See also 
 92nd Academy Awards
 77th Golden Globe Awards
 73rd British Academy Film Awards
 40th Golden Raspberry Awards
 35th Independent Spirit Awards
 31st Producers Guild of America Awards
 26th Screen Actors Guild Awards
 25th Critics' Choice Awards
 24th Satellite Awards

References

External links 
 
 Guldbaggen on Twitter
 Guldbaggen on Facebook
 55th Guldbagge Awards at IMDb

2020 in Swedish cinema
2019 film awards
Guldbagge Awards ceremonies
2020s in Stockholm
January 2020 events in Sweden